Shamsudheen Cherpulassery is an Indian magician from Kerala. He won the Kalasree award from Kerala Sangeeta Nataka Akademi in 2014.  He is an expert in the "Mango Trick" magic.

Biography
Shamsudheen's father Hassan Sahib was a street magician. He was the first guru for Shamsudheen in magic.  Shamudheen is maintaining his livelihood through street magic. The Time Magazine and The Hindu have reported about his Mango trick.

Awards
 Kerala Sangeetha Nataka Akademi Award (Kalasree) from Kerala Sangeetha Nataka Akademi (2014)

References

Indian magicians
Living people
Year of birth missing (living people)
Recipients of the Kerala Sangeetha Nataka Akademi Award